The J.League 1995 season is the third season of the J.League Division 1. The league fixture began on March 18, 1995, and ended on November 1995.  The Suntory Championship '95 took place on November 30 and December 6, 1995.

Honours

1995 J.League clubs
Following fourteen clubs participated in J.League during 1995 season. Of these clubs, Kashiwa Reysol, and Cerezo Osaka were newly promoted from Japan Football League (former).

Kashima Antlers
Urawa Red Diamonds
JEF United Ichihara
Kashiwa Reysol 
Verdy Kawasaki
Yokohama Marinos
Yokohama Flügels
Bellmare Hiratsuka
Shimizu S-Pulse
Júbilo Iwata
Nagoya Grampus Eight
Gamba Osaka
Cerezo Osaka 
Sanfrecce Hiroshima

1995 J.League format
In the 1995 season, the league followed split-season format, and each halves (or stages) were known as Suntory Series and NICOS Series for sponsorship purposes.  In each series, fourteen clubs played in double round-robin format, a total of 26 games per club (per series).  The games went to golden-goal extra time and penalties if needed after regulation.  The points system is introduced for the first time and a club received 3pts for any win, 1pts for PK loss, and 0pts for regulation or extra time loss. The clubs were ranked by points and tie breakers are, in the following order: 
 Goal differential
 Goals scored
 Head-to-head results
 Extra match or a coin toss
The club that finished at the top of the table is declared stage champion and qualifies for the Suntory Championship.  The first stage winner, hosts the first leg in the championship series.  If the same club win both stages, the runners-up of each stages plays against each other and the winners challenges the stage winner at the championship game. 

Changes in Competition Format
 Number of competing clubs increased from 12 to 14
 Number of games per club in a series increased from 22 to 26 games and from 44 to 52 games per season
 Points system were introduced
 Due to fixture congestion, Yamazaki Nabisco Cup was canceled that year

1995 J.League final standings

Suntory Series (1st Stage) standings

NICOS Series (2nd stage) standings

1995 Suntory Championship 

Yokohama Marinos won the series 2–0 on aggregate.

Overall standings

Golden Boot ranking 
Golden Boot standings after Suntory Series (1st Stage)

Overall Golden Boot ranking

Awards

Individual Awards

Best Eleven

External links
 Source: J. League 1995 (RSSSF)

J1 League seasons
1
Japan
Japan